Versus the World is an American post-hardcore/pop punk band from Santa Barbara, California, United States, formed by Donald Spence and Mike Davenport. The band combines post-hardcore with pop punk and is currently signed to Viking Funeral Records. They released their debut album, "Versus the World", in September 2005.

History

Formation & Self-Titled Debut (2005–2006)
Versus the World is a punk rock band from Santa Barbara, California, United States, on Kung Fu Records. The band combines post-hardcore with pop punk. They released their debut album, Versus the World, in September 2005. Mike Davenport was the longtime bassist from The Ataris. Versus The World formed in the back of The Ataris old record store (“Down On Haley”). Prior to being called Versus The World, Mike Davenport and Donald Spence did a few acoustic shows under the band name “Pencapchew” to fill time between their current projects. They have also made a music video for one of their song “Is There No End”. They toured the US and Europe rigorously with bands such as No Use For A Name, Suicide Machines, Bouncing Souls, The Lawrence Arms, Social Distortion, I Am The Avalanche, and the Vans Warped Tour. They also released a song entitled “Blue and Cold” on the Vans Warped Tour Taste of Christmas compilation, which was featured as a bonus track on European versions of the album.

Drink. Sing. Live. Love. (2010–2013)
In August 2010, VTW announced their return, with new members Chris Flippin of Lagwagon and Bryan Charlson of Spence's side band Crooks & Liars. They stated they were set to work on a new EP with an accompanying tour to follow. However, in 2011 the band announced that they had opted to release a full album instead. On July 30, 2011 a new song "In Fear of Finale" was released. It is the first new material from the band since the song "Blue and Cold". Later, on September 13, the band posted an acoustic preview of another song, titled "A Love Song for Amsterdam". In 2012, Versus the World embarked on a full scale European tour, including a date on the festival Groezrock. On April 25, 2012 the album was finally announced as "Drink. Sing. Live. Love." due to be released July 13 on Viking Funeral Records. On July 31, a music video for the track "A Fond Farewell" was put out to coincide with the album's US release.

Homesick/Roadsick (2015–2021)
In 2015 they released the third album, called Homesick/Roadsick.

Unknown New Album (2021-present)
In 2021 they announced that the band was recording a new album.

Other media
The song Forgive Me was featured on the WWE SmackDown vs. Raw 2007 videogame.

Albums

References

External links
 Facebook

American post-hardcore musical groups
Pop punk groups from California
Punk rock groups from California